Mavi (also Romanized as Māvī; also known as Ma'vā and Ma‘vá) is a village in Pirsalman Rural District, in the Central District of Asadabad County, Hamadan Province, Iran. At the 2006 census, its population was 266, in 53 families.

References 

Populated places in Asadabad County